Bernard H. Robertson, III.  (born June 9, 1979) is a former American football offensive tackle in the National Football League. He was drafted by the Chicago Bears in the fifth round of the 2001 NFL Draft. He played college football for Tulane University. He played two years for the Bears and for the Buffalo Bills in 2003.

After the NFL, he has worked in financial services, working at firms including Legg Mason, Citigroup, Merrill Lynch, and Raymond James.  He is now a registered investment adviser with the firm of Hacket Robertson Tobe Group.

References

1979 births
Living people
Players of American football from New Orleans
American football offensive tackles
Tulsa Golden Hurricane football players
Chicago Bears players
Buffalo Bills players